Ips avulsus, the small southern pine engraver, is a species of typical bark beetle in the family Curculionidae. The pheromones ipsenol, ipsdienol, and lanieron combined attract the most colonization in the host material in regards to the chemical ecology of the small southern pine engraver, which also effects their reproduction processes.

References

Further reading

External links

 

Scolytinae
Articles created by Qbugbot
Beetles described in 1868